The 2013 Korea Grand Prix Gold was the fifteenth badminton tournament of the 2013 BWF Grand Prix Gold and Grand Prix. The tournament was held in Jeonju Indoor Badminton Court, Jeonju, South Korea November 5–10, 2013 and had a total purse of $120,000.

Men's singles

Seeds

  Hsu Jen-hao (second round)
  Lee Dong-keun (third round)
  Mohd Arif Abdul Latif (first round)
  Wisnu Yuli Prasetyo (first round)
  Riyanto Subagja (second round)
  Zulfadli Zulkiffli (second round)
  Misha Zilberman (second round)
  Riichi Takeshita (third round)
  Petr Koukal (second round)
  Iskandar Zulkarnain Zainuddin (quarter-final)
  Tian Houwei (semi-final)
  Simon Santoso (quarter-final)
  Shon Wan-ho (third round)
  Wan Chia-hsin (first round)
  Xue Song (second round)
  Park Sung-min (third round)

Finals

Top half

Section 1

Section 2

Section 3

Section 4

Bottom half

Section 5

Section 6

Section 7

Section 8

Women's singles

Seeds

  Sung Ji-hyun (final)
  Bae Youn-joo (champion)
  Aprilia Yuswandari (second round)
  Pai Hsiao-ma (second round)
  Deng Xuan (first round)
  Hera Desi (quarter-final)
  Maria Febe Kusumastuti (second round)
  Suo Di (quarter-final)

Finals

Top half

Section 1

Section 2

Bottom half

Section 3

Section 4

Men's doubles

Seeds

  Kim Ki-jung / Kim Sa-rang (champion)
  Liang Jui-wei / Liao Kuan-hao (second round)
  Ruud Bosch / Koen Ridder (first round)
  Gan Teik Chai / Ong Soon Hock (first round)
  Lee Yong-dae / Yoo Yeon-seong (quarter-final)
  Ko Sung-hyun / Shin Baek-cheol (final)
  Chen Hung-ling / Lu Chia-bin (quarter-final)
  Shi Longfei / Wang Yilu (first round)

Finals

Top half

Section 1

Section 2

Bottom half

Section 3

Section 4

Women's doubles

Seeds

  Jung Kyung-eun / Kim Ha-na (second round)
  Ko A-ra / Yoo Hae-won (final)
  Shinta Mulia Sari / Yao Lei (semi-final)
  Jang Ye-na / Kim So-young (champion)

Finals

Top half

Section 1

Section 2

Bottom half

Section 3

Section 4

Mixed doubles

Seeds

  Danny Bawa Chrisnanta / Vanessa Neo Yu Yan (first round)
  Shin Baek-cheol / Eom Hye-won (first round)
  Ko Sung-hyun / Kim Ha-na (first round)
  Irfan Fadhilah / Weni Anggraini (semi-final)
  Yoo Yeon-seong / Jang Ye-na (champion)
  Tan Aik Quan / Lai Pei Jing (first round)
  Kim Ki-jung / Kim So-young (semi-final)
  Lukhi Apri Nugroho / Annisa Saufika (first round)

Finals

Top half

Section 1

Section 2

Bottom half

Section 3

Section 4

References

External links
 Tournament link

Korea Masters
Korea
Open Grand Prix Gold
Sports competitions in Jeonju
Korea Open Grand Prix Gold
November 2013 sports events in South Korea